Grey Wolf: The Escape of Adolf Hitler is a 2011 book by Gerrard Williams (1958 - 2022) and Simon Dunstan. The book was adapted as a docudrama film in 2014, directed and written by Gerrard Williams and produced by Magnus Peterson. The book and associated film were given extensive coverage in the British media.

Plot
According to the film-makers, Hitler's escape was organised by Martin Bormann, who also fled to Argentina, and was aided and abetted by the Government of Juan Perón. The film also alleges that American intelligence agencies were aware Hitler was in Argentina, and that significant funds were also taken from Germany to Argentina and that these were later stolen by Bormann. The film alleges that Hitler died in Argentina alone, poor and mentally ill in 1962, leaving behind a wife and at least one child.

Film

Cast
Dante Venesio as Adolf Hitler
Maria Heller as Eva Braun
Pietro Gian as Martin Bormann

Production
The film was initially produced by two interrelated UK companies, Gerbil Films Ltd and Lobos Gris Ltd. Subsequent to filming, the rights to the film passed to a third company, Grey Wolf Media Ltd, who were responsible for its final release. The film was distributed worldwide by Australian Distributor Galloping Films. In May 2016, Grey Wolf Media Ltd was compulsorily wound up under the Companies Act 2006, and the rights to the film became Bona Vacantia. As such the ownership of the film rights passed to the UK Crown.

Grey Wolf was filmed in 2008 in Argentina, using local actors and many in the community as extras. Although produced by an English company, the film is mainly in Spanish with English subtitles.

Reception
The film was released straight to DVD in 2014 and was not therefore subject to significant critical film reviews. However, on Amazon UK, 42% of purchasers gave it a five star rating while 25% gave it a one star rating. On Amazon.com, 57% gave it a five star rating and 29% a one star rating.

The liquidators of Grey Wolf Media Limited described the film as "largely unsuccessful" in their May 2018 Progress Report and said that it generated revenues of only AUD$55,000 (about USD$39,000) and that much of this was paid in the form of guarantees by distributors rather than sales.

Controversies 
The book and film concern one of many conspiracy theories about Adolf Hitler's death. Such viewpoints are regarded by historians and scientific experts as disproven fringe theories.

British historian Guy Walters described Dunstan and Williams' theory as  "2,000 per cent rubbish" when the book was published. Walters added: "It's an absolute disgrace. There's no substance to it at all. It appeals to the deluded fantasies of conspiracy theorists and has no place whatsoever in historical research."

Weavering Capital
A significant controversy about the film relates to its funding and its link to the Weavering Capital scandal. Weavering Capital was a UK-based Hedge Fund Management Company that collapsed in 2009 after it was discovered that $600M of investors' money had been lost, mainly due to bogus swap contracts created by its Managing Director, Magnus Peterson. Peterson was also the producer of the Grey Wolf film and along with Williams held significant financial interests in both Gerbil Films Ltd and Lobos Gris Ltd.

During efforts by the Official Receiver of Weavering Capital to recover the missing money, it was discovered that, in addition to the bogus swap contracts, Peterson had used investors' money without their permission to fund a number of personal projects including the Grey Wolf film. At least $1.3M of investors' money was identified as having been spent on the film, although the Weavering Capital accounts showed an investment valued at $4.47M. It was also discovered that, while acting fraudulently, Peterson had also taken $9M in fees from Weavering Capital, and his wife, also a Weavering Director, $4.3M and that during this period these two individuals also invested personally in the film through an investment vehicle they jointly owned called Magnumhold Ltd.

Following the collapse of Weavering Capital, both of the companies involved in the production of the film also collapsed. Lobos Gris Ltd was put into receivership in March 2010, leaving $345k of unpaid creditors. In August 2012, Gerbil Films was dissolved via compulsory strike-off. Its last published accounts showed $465k of unpaid creditors.

On the liquidation of Lobos Gris Ltd, the rights to the film were purchased by Grey Wolf Media Ltd, a new company mainly owned by Williams and Peterson. This purchase was again funded from Peterson's investment vehicle, Magnumhold Ltd, in the form of share capital and loans to Grey Wolf Media and its director which totalled $294k by March 2011 Ltd, while the December 2015 liquidators' report shows an investment with an alleged value of $737k.

At a civil trial in 2012, Peterson, his wife and two other directors were found liable for the losses at Weavering Capital and ordered to pay $450M in damages, making them effectively bankrupt and leading to the liquidation of Magnumhold Ltd. In a 2015 criminal trial, Magnus Peterson was found guilty of 8 charges of fraud and related offences in relation to his role as Managing Director of Weavering Capital and sentenced to 13 years in prison.

As of December 2015, the liquidators are still trying to recover funds spent on the film by Peterson via both Weavering and Magnumhold. However, on 24 May 2016, Grey Wolf Media Ltd was compulsorily wound up under the Companies Act 2016 as no accounts had been filed for over two years. The last published accounts (2014) showed debts of $267k. In total, the 3 companies making the film (Gerbil Films, Lobos Gris & Grey Wolf Media) recorded unpaid debts to creditors of $1.08M.

While the total amount spent is unclear, investigative journalist Laurence de Mello believes the figure to be in excess of $2M but also alleges that there were a number of issues with the project's accounting and governance. The film's Australian distributor lists the budget as $2.3M  while IMDb lists it as $3.6M (estimated).

Ricardo D'Aloia
In 2011, the film and book were hit by a second scandal when Ricardo D'Aloia, editorial director of Ambito Financiero, took issue with some of the claims made by the authors and producers. In both the book and promotional material for the film, it was stated in reference to eyewitness accounts of Hitler being in Argentina that "It is the words of these witnesses, on a tape given to us by the papers' editorial director Ricardo D'Aloia that have contributed to the findings in this book." Mr D'Aloia wrote to the publishers "in order to clarify the fact that the statement is not at all true" and went on to say "I hope you will understand that I do not appreciate in any way having been named in your publication, and so involved in such a unpleasant episode with which I have absolutely no relation".
...

Abel Basti
In 2013, the film was hit by a further scandal when Abel Basti, an Argentine journalist, alleged that the Grey Wolf film and book had plagiarised his work, and began legal action for compensation. Basti had previously published the book Bariloche nazi-guía turística in 2004, where he lay forwards claims about Adolf Hitler and Eva Braun living in the surroundings of Bariloche for many years after World War II, mentioning also the estate of Inalco as Hitler's refuge.

References

External links
 

2011 non-fiction books
2014 films
2014 documentary films
2014 direct-to-video films
2010s war films
Films based on non-fiction books
Films set in the 1940s
Films shot in Argentina
Films about Adolf Hitler
British World War II films
2014 drama films
British docudrama films
Books about Adolf Hitler
Books about conspiracy theories
Films about conspiracy theories
2010s British films
Sterling Publishing books